Leandro Coronel (born 10 February 1988) is an Argentine football midfielder who plays for Liniers. He usually plays as a centre midfielder and, occasionally, as a right winger.

Career

Coronel made his league debut in a 3-2 away win against Banfield on 15 April 2007. He scored his first goal for the club on 18 April 2009 in a 2-0 victory over Arsenal de Sarandí. During that year, he was part of the Vélez squad that won the Clausura championship.

Coronel was loaned to recently promoted Quilmes for the 2010–11 Argentine Primera División season. After one season with Quilmes, he was loaned to Instituto in the Primera B Nacional (Argentine second division).

Honours 

Vélez Sársfield
Argentine Primera División (1): 2009 Clausura

References

External links
 Statistics at Irish Times
 Career statistics at BDFA 
 Argentine Primera statistics at Fútbol XXI 

1988 births
Living people
People from Morón Partido
Argentine footballers
Association football midfielders
Club Atlético Vélez Sarsfield footballers
Quilmes Atlético Club footballers
Instituto footballers
Deportes Iquique footballers
Chilean Primera División players
Argentine Primera División players
Expatriate footballers in Chile
Sportspeople from Buenos Aires Province